is a reservoir in Kawachinagano, Osaka Prefecture, Japan. It is for irrigation to paddy fields near this lake. It was made in the Edo period. Fishing is prohibited in the lake.

Summaries 
Teragaike lies to the north of Kawachinagano, Osaka Prefecture, Japan. About 15 minutes walk from Chiyoda Station on Nankai Kōya Line.
Surrounding the lake is maintained esplanade, and people of the neighborhood utilize it for a stroll.
North bank
There are steles, a sluice of aqueducts for irrigation, a plaza, and playground equipment for training.
There are residential areas around the lake.
People can watch PL Art of Fireworks every year on August 1.

South bank
There are houses and fields around this area.

Teragaike Park
There are tennis courts, a small baseball park, a gateball court, and a civic swimming pool on the east side.

History 
 1649: played a key role, and originally they expanded the small pond which there was, and, for newly reclaiming a rice field, it was made. A total of about 40,000 was mobilized.
 1969:Finished renovation

See also 
List of dams and reservoirs

Reservoirs in Japan
Landforms of Osaka Prefecture
Tourist attractions in Osaka Prefecture